Sepia saya is a species of cuttlefish known only from its type locality in the southwestern Indian Ocean. It lives at depths of 87 to 117 m.

Sepia saya grows to a mantle length of 90 mm.

The type specimen was collected near the Saya-de-Malha Bank in the Indian Ocean ( to ). It is deposited at the Zoological Museum in Moscow.

References

External links

Cuttlefish
Molluscs described in 1991